The marathon standings for the Swedish Hockey League (SHL) (formerly named Elitserien) is an accumulated table for the Swedish Hockey League, the current top Swedish ice hockey league, since it was inaugurated in the 1975–76 season. The marathon standings, updated by the Swedish Ice Hockey Association (SIHA), presents an overview of the overall regular-season records for all teams who have played at least one season in the SHL. The table is sorted after the highest number of total points.

Färjestad BK are currently leading the table, with 3216 points. Färjestad BK and Brynäs IF are the only two teams to have played in all 47 SHL seasons. Växjö Lakers have the highest point average, with 87.2 points per season, and the highest point percentage (54.5%). Färjestad BK has the highest winning percentage (49.3%). Färjestad BK have qualified for the playoffs 40 times, more than any other team.

Standings after the 2022–23 season

Notes 
The "Playoff appearances" column tells exactly how many times a particular team has qualified for the quarterfinals. The "Cur. SHL" column indicates whether the team plays in the SHL as of the 2021–22 season; a green box indicates that the team plays in the 2021–22 SHL season.

Point average is the average number of points per season; that is, the total number of points divided by the number of seasons. Point percentage is the total number of points divided by the total number of possible points. Winning percentage is the percentage of wins, determined by dividing the total number of wins by the total number of games played. Both the point averages, the winning percentages and the point percentages are rounded to one decimal.

Newer SHL teams record higher point averages, due to the fact that the league has only been using the 3-point system (that is, 3 points for a regulation-time win) since the 1998–99 season, as well as the fact that only 36–40 games were played until the 1996–97 season. Since the 1996–97 season, each season consists of at least 50 games (55 games since the 2006–07 season). Before the 1998–99 season, the teams received two points for each win instead of three. Also, from the 1987–88 season until the 1996–97 season, the two worst teams after the first 22 games were relegated to Allsvenskan; the remaining teams played another 18 games. For these reasons, point percentage is a more accurate way of determining each team's overall performance in the regular season. It is possible to get 165 points in one season, due to the 3-point system and the 55-game schedule.

Regarding the winning percentages, note that, due to the former 2-point system, overtime or shootout wins also counted as wins from the 1975–76 season through the 1997–98 season. Since the 1998–99 season, when the 3-point system was introduced, only regulation-time wins count as wins.

See also
Marathon standings for the top Swedish ice hockey league
List of SHL seasons

References
Historical.stats.swehockey.se

Swedish Hockey League